Nikola Sudová (born 17 March 1982 in Jablonec nad Nisou) is a Czech freestyle skier known for moguls. She has two World Cup victories and competed for the Czech Republic at the 2006 Winter Olympics. She competed in ladies moguls for the Czech Republic at the 2010 Winter Olympics.

She is the older sister of Šárka Sudová.

References 

1982 births
Living people
Czech female freestyle skiers
Olympic freestyle skiers of the Czech Republic
Freestyle skiers at the 2002 Winter Olympics
Freestyle skiers at the 2006 Winter Olympics
Freestyle skiers at the 2010 Winter Olympics
Freestyle skiers at the 2014 Winter Olympics
Sportspeople from Jablonec nad Nisou